OPTN may refer to:
 Optineurin
 Organ Procurement and Transplantation Network, operated by the United Network for Organ Sharing, which facilitates organ transplantation in the United States